Carolyn Jane Onslow How (born 21 December 1950) is an English actress with a range of television, film, and stage credits. She is best known for her role as Jan Hammond, the mistress of Den Watts in EastEnders. She appeared in the programme regularly from 1986 to 1987 and also made brief return appearances in 2002 and 2003, the latter leading up to Den's return to the show.

Career
After training at the Webber Douglas Academy of Dramatic Art, where she won the Rodney Millington Award, she spent several years in provincial theatre.

Other roles include two series of "The Spoils of War ", War and Remembrance, A.D., "Anglo Saxon Attitudes", "The Cazalet Chronicles", "Zoya", "Love in a Cold Climate", another famous mistress, Camilla Parker Bowles, in the TV movie Charles and Diana: Unhappily Ever After (1992). She has also appeared in The Citadel, Midsomer Murders, Judge John Deed, "Byron", Bad Girls, "Love Soup", "Armadillo", Agatha Christie's Poirot, "Daniel Deronda", as well as in four series of the sitcom Don't Wait Up as Helen with Nigel Havers. Her first television credit was in the 1973 Doctor Who story Planet of the Daleks.

Her films include AKA (2002), A Good Woman (2004), The Best Man (2005), Miss Potter (2006) and 1st Night (2010).

In the West End, she has appeared for the R.S.C. in The Return of A. J. Raffles, as Larita in Noël Coward's Easy Virtue at The Garrick, she was in the original cast of Don't Dress for Dinner at The Apollo, Home and Beauty at the Lyric and Top People at the Ambassadors Theatre. How has also played Lady Punnett in the highly successful Half a Sixpence, which opened in the Noël Coward Theatre on 17 November 2016 and had its last performance on Saturday 2 September 2017 after 347 performances.

In 2009, How appeared as a finishing school teacher in a commercial for Go Compare insurance, while in March 2010 she appeared briefly as hospital executive Zara Merrick in the BBC1 drama series Casualty. In 2014, she played the role of Joan Rogerson in Fatal Attraction, at the Theatre Royal Haymarket. In 2018, she played the role of Florence Boorman in Her Naked Skin at the Salisbury Playhouse.

Personal life
In 1977, she married actor Mark Burns; they had a son, Jack, in 1981 and divorced in 1983. She later married actor Richard Durden, in 1996.

She has been chairwoman of the charity the Theatrical Guild since 2011, having been involved with the committee for many years.

References

External links
 

English television actresses
English soap opera actresses
Living people
1950 births